Gerrick McPhearson Jr (born December 29, 1983 in Columbia, Maryland) is a former American football cornerback. He was on the New York Giants practice squad in 2006 mostly before being activated to the active roster in the latter part of the season, but he did not play in any regular season or postseason games. He was selected in the seventh round of the 2006 NFL Draft out of the University of Maryland. He is the older brother of Eagles cornerback Zech McPhearson.

1983 births
American football cornerbacks
Living people
Maryland Terrapins football players
New York Giants players
People from Columbia, Maryland